The 1964–65 season was the 92nd season of competitive football in Scotland and the 68th season of Scottish league football.

Scottish League Division One

In one of the closest finishes ever seen in a league competition in Britain, Hearts faced Kilmarnock on the last day of the season with
a two-point lead over the Ayrshire club and a slightly better goal average (goals scored divided by goals conceded). Kilmarnock had to beat Hearts by at least 2–0 to win the title. Any worse result for Kilmarnock, including any other two goal winning margin, e.g. 3–1 or 4–2, would have made Hearts champions. Kilmarnock won 2–0, and were champions.

The 1964–65 season is notable for both Celtic and Rangers finishing in mid-table. It was, and remains as of 2021, only the fifth time that neither of them had finished in the top two, and the only time that both of the Old Firm clubs had failed to finish in the top three of the First Division in the same season.

The season was also interesting in that it was the one and only season that East Stirling Clydebank (E.S. Clydebank) competed in the Scottish League, reverting to East Stirlingshire for season 1965/66 with Clydebank entering the league the following year.

Champions: Kilmarnock
Relegated: Airdrieonains, Third Lanark

Scottish League Division Two

Promoted: Stirling Albion, Hamilton Academical

Cup honours

Other honours

National

County

 - aggregate over two legs

Highland League

Individual honours

Scotland national team

Scotland came third in the 1965 British Home Championship

Key:
(H) = Home match
(A) = Away match
WCQG8 = World Cup qualifying - Group 8
BHC = British Home Championship

Notes and references

External links
Scottish Football Historical Archive

 
Seasons in Scottish football